The  was a monetary unit of Japan. The Ichibuban could be either made of silver or gold, in which case it was a quarter of a Koban. 

The gold Ichibuban of 1714 (佐渡一分判金) had a weight of 4.5 g, with 85.6% of gold and 14.2% of silver. The silver Ichibuban from 1837 to 1854 (Tenpō Ichibugin, 天保一分銀, "Old Ichibuban") weighed 8.66 g, with an alloy of 0.21% gold and 98.86% silver.

The Nibuban (二分判) was worth double the Ichibuban, and half a Koban and was also a rectangular coin.

Gold Ichibuban (一分判金)

See also

 Tokugawa coinage

Notes

Coins of Japan
Silver coins
Gold coins
Modern obsolete currencies
Economic history of Japan